Linnéa Mary Hansdotter Deb (née Sporre; born 23 July 1977), known professionally as Linnea Deb, is a Swedish singer, songwriter and record producer. She has worked with artists such as Fifth Harmony, JoJo, MiC Lowry and Akon.

Deb is signed to Northbound Music Publishing in Stockholm, where she is a member of the production team The Family together with Joy Deb and Anton Hård af Segerstad. Earlier (2013-2016) the group was signed to BMG Publishing.

Early career 
In her early career Linnea sang in several choirs and she toured with Ace of Base and Carola. Also, she has been choiring for several different albums and songs, one of them being "Cara Mia" with Swedish artist Måns Zelmerlöw.
 
In 2012, Linnea co-wrote Ulrik Munther’s album with the same name, Ulrik Munther, which immediately reached position 1 on Swedish album chart and the single "Boy’s Don't Cry", which features on the album, was sold gold.

Melodifestivalen 
Linnea has done several successful contributions in the annual Swedish song contest Melodifestivalen. She has contributed to the contest with 11 songs among which two were the winnings songs. The first winning song was in 2013 with "You" by Robin Stjernberg, which later this year  broke a Swedish record for most played song during one day and it got nominated for a Swedish Grammy as Song of the year in 2014.

The second winning song was "Heroes" performed by Måns Zelmerlöw in 2015. The song also won the Eurovision Song Contest 2015. It was certified 5× platinum in Sweden and certified gold in Spain, Norway and Austria.

In Melodifestivalen 2016, her production-team The Family managed to get 4 different contributions to the contest - performed by Lisa Ajax, Ace Wilder, Molly Pettersson and ISA. Thanks to these contributions, they were appointed as Songwriter of the year in the contest. The contribution with Ace Wilder "Don't Worry" later got featured in the trailer for Bridget Jones's Baby. In 2017, Linnea co-wrote two of the competing songs in Melodifestivalen - "I Don't Give A" by Lisa Ajax and "Statements" by Loreen. She co-wrote two of the entries in Melodifestivalen 2019, being "Hello" by Mohombi and "No Drama" for High15.

International releases 
Linnea has also written and produced several international hits. She co-wrote the first record "Top Down" on Fifth Harmony's Reflection album. Also, Linnea and her production team wrote and produced JoJo's comeback single "Save My Soul". Linnea has also co-written the Polish artists Margaret's single "Cool Me Down" which was sold double platinum in Poland and gold in Sweden.

In 2016, "Oh Lord" was released with the British vocal harmony boy band Mic Lowry, which was their debut single and it was written by Joy, Linnea Deb, Anton Hård af Segerstad, Augustine Grant and Phil Collins, as the song contains lyrics and music from Phil Collins' song "In the Air Tonight".

Personal life 
Deb is of partial Finnish descent through her parents.

List of written songs

Melodifestivalen entries (Sweden)

Melodi Grand Prix entries (Norway)

Krajowe Eliminacje entries (Poland)

Uuden Musiikin Kilpailu entries (Finland)

Dansk Melodi Grand Prix entries (Denmark)

Dora entries (Croatia)

Eesti Laul entries (Estonia)

References

1977 births
Eurovision Song Contest winners
Living people
Swedish people of Finnish descent
Swedish women record producers
Swedish songwriters